Akiva Tor is an Israeli diplomat who has served as the Israeli Ambassador to the Republic of Korea since November 2020.

Born on Fort Jackson, South Carolina, Tor received his B.A. in analytical philosophy from Columbia University in 1985, then received his MA in Political Science and Contemporary Jewish Thought from the Hebrew University of Jerusalem, and an MPA from Harvard Kennedy School in 2003 with the support of the Wexner Foundation. He was a Goldman Fellow at Tel Aviv University in 2020. He made aliyah at age 24 and served as a paratrooper in the Israel Defense Forces from 1985 to 1987, and was honorably discharged from the IDF reserves as a Captain in 2008.

Tor entered the Israel Foreign Ministry cadet course in November 1987 and began his diplomatic career as Director at the Israel Economic and Cultural Office in Taipei in 1996. On return to Israel he served as Deputy Spokesman from 1998 to 2000 and Deputy Director of the Department for Palestinian Affairs from 2000 to 2002.

From 2003 to 2006, he was the World Jewish Affairs Adviser to the President of Israel.

From 2008 to 2012, he was the Israel Consul General in San Francisco and Pacific Northwest.

From 2013 to 2020, he was the Head of Bureau for World Jewish Affairs and World Religions in Ministry of Foreign Affairs.

In June 2020, Tor was named Israeli Ambassador to South Korea. He assumed post in November 2020.

References 

Ambassadors of Israel to South Korea
Living people
Columbia College (New York) alumni
Hebrew University of Jerusalem alumni
Harvard Kennedy School alumni
Israeli diplomats
Year of birth missing (living people)